Le Dernier Verre (French for "The Last Glass") is a best-selling book by French cardiologist Olivier Ameisen that was published in 2008 and describes the author's experience of curing himself of alcoholism using the muscle relaxant, baclofen.

The book has been translated to English as The End of My Addiction, and German as Das Ende meiner Sucht.

References

External links
 The End Of My Addiction.org Dedicated to the memory of OA, offering support to users of all medications with listing citations and documents relating to Baclofen
Entry at Amazon

2008 non-fiction books
Alcohol abuse
Works about alcoholism
Éditions Denoël books